The Bay de Verde Formation is a formation cropping out in Newfoundland.

Ediacaran Newfoundland and Labrador